The Unfaithful Eckehart (German: Der ungetreue Eckehart) is a 1931 German comedy film directed by Carl Boese and starring Ralph Arthur Roberts, Fritz Schulz and Paul Hörbiger. The film is based on the play of the same title by Hans Stürm. It was remade in 1940. A silent film was made by Reinhold Schünzel in 1928 under the title Don Juan in a Girls' School.

Synopsis
A man who is faithful to his wife is mistakenly blamed for the philandering antics of his brother-in-law.

Cast

References

Bibliography 
 Grange, William. Cultural Chronicle of the Weimar Republic. Scarecrow Press, 2008.

External links 
 

1931 films
Films of the Weimar Republic
German comedy films
1931 comedy films
1930s German-language films
Films directed by Carl Boese
German black-and-white films
Remakes of German films
Sound film remakes of silent films
German films based on plays
1930s German films